Kim Bang-han was a South Korean linguist. He proposed primitive Korean peninsula language theory. Primitive Korean peninsula language is a now-extinct non-Koreanic languages that some linguists believe were formerly spoken in central and southern parts of the Korean peninsula.

References 

Linguists from Korea
Academic staff of Seoul National University